The men's 110 metres hurdles event at the 2019 African Games was held on 26 and 27 August in Rabat.

Medalists

Results

Heats
Qualification: First 3 in each heat (Q) and the next 2 fastest (q) advanced to the final.

Wind:Heat 1: -0.8 m/s, Heat 2: -0.8 m/s

Final
Wind: +0.4 m/s

References

100
African Games